Mascarpone is a soft Italian acid-set cream cheese.

Outside Italy, mascarpone is sometimes mispronounced as "marscapone", even by food professionals.

Production process
After denaturation of the cream, the whey is removed without pressing or aging. Mascarpone may also be made using cream and the residual tartaric acid from the bottom or sides of barreled wine.

The traditional method is to use three tablespoons of lemon juice per pint of heated heavy cream. The cream is allowed to cool to room temperature before it is poured into a cheesecloth-lined colander, set into a shallow pan or dish, and chilled and strained for one to two days.

Origins
Mascarpone originated in the Italian region of Lombardy in the area between Lodi and Abbiategrasso south of Milan, probably in the late 16th or early 17th century. Popularly, the name is held to derive from mascarpa, an unrelated milk product made from the whey of stracchino (a young, barely aged cheese), or from mascarpia, a word in the local dialect for ricotta. Unlike ricotta, which is made from whey, mascarpone is made from cream.

Uses
Mascarpone is milky-white in colour and is easy to spread. It is used in various Lombardy dishes and is considered a specialty in the region. 

Mascarpone is one of the main ingredients in tiramisu. Sometimes it is used instead of, or along with, butter or Parmesan cheese to thicken and enrich risotto. Mascarpone also is used in cheesecake recipes.

See also
Crème fraîche
List of dairy products

References

External links
 

Cow's-milk cheeses
Cream cheeses
Lombard cheeses